This is a list of famous physicians in history.

Chronological lists

Ancient physicians 
30th century BCE to 4th century CE
 List of ancient physicians

Post-classical physicians 
5th century CE to 15th century CE
 List of post-classical physicians

Early modern physicians
16th century CE to the mid-18th century CE

 List of early modern physicians

Late modern physicians 
mid-18th century CE to the mid-20th century CE

 List of late modern physicians

Physicians famous for their role in advancement of medicine 

 William Osler Abbott (1902–1943) — co-developed the Miller-Abbott tube
 William Stewart Agras (born 1929) — feeding behavior
 Virginia Apgar (1909–1974) — anesthesiologist who devised the Apgar score used after childbirth
 Jean Astruc (1684–1766) — wrote one of the first treatises on syphilis
 Averroes (1126–1198) — Andalusian polymath
 Avicenna (980–1037) — Persian physician
 Gerbrand Bakker (1771–1828) — Dutch physician, with works in Dutch and Latin on midwifery, practical surgery, animal magnetism, worms, the human eye, comparative anatomy, and the anatomy of the brain
 Frederick Banting (1891–1941) — isolated insulin
 Christiaan Barnard (1922–2001) — performed first heart transplant
 Charles Best (1899–1978) — assisted in the discovery of insulin
 Norman Bethune (1890–1939) — developer of battlefield surgical techniques
 Theodor Billroth (1829–1894) — father of modern abdominal surgery
 Elizabeth Blackwell (1821–1910) — first woman to receive a medical degree in the United States; first openly identified woman to receive a medical degree; pioneered the advancement of women in medicine
 Alfred Blalock (1899–1964) — noted for his research on the medical condition of shock and the development of the Blalock-Taussig Shunt, surgical relief of the cyanosis from Tetralogy of Fallot, known commonly as the blue baby syndrome, with his assistant Vivien Thomas and pediatric cardiologist Helen Taussig
 James Carson (1772–1843)
 Charaka ( – 200 CE) — Indian physician
 Jean-Martin Charcot (1825–1893) — pioneering neurologist
 Guy de Chauliac (1290–1368) — one of the first physicians to have an experimental approach towards medicine; also recorded the Black Death
 Anna Manning Comfort (1845-1931) — first woman medical graduate to practice in the state of Connecticut
 Loren Cordain (born 1950) — American nutritionist and exercise physiologist, Paleolithic diet
 Harvey Cushing (1869–1939) — American neurosurgeon; father of modern-day brain surgery
 Garcia de Orta (1501–1568) — revealed herbal medicines of India, described cholera
 Gerhard Domagk (1895–1964) — pathologist and bacteriologist; credited with the discovery of sulfonamidochrysoidine (KI-730), the first commercially available antibiotic; won 1939 the Nobel Prize in Physiology or Medicine
 Charles R. Drew (1904–1950) — blood transfusion pioneer
 Helen Flanders Dunbar (1902–1959) — important early figure in U.S. psychosomatic medicine
 Galen (129–) — Roman physician and anatomist
 Paul Ehrlich (1854–1915) — German scientist; won the 1908 Nobel Prize in Physiology or Medicine; developed Ehrlich's reagent
 Christiaan Eijkman (1858–1930) — pathologist, studied beriberi
 Pierre Fauchard — father of dentistry
 René Gerónimo Favaloro (1923–2000) — Argentine cardiac surgeon who created the coronary bypass grafting procedure
 Alexander Fleming (1881–1955) — Scottish scientist, inventor of penicillin
 Girolamo Fracastoro (1478–1553) — wrote on syphilis, forerunner of germ theory
 Sigmund Freud (1856–1939) — founder of psychoanalysis
 Daniel Carleton Gajdusek (1923–2008) — studied Kuru, Nobel prize winner
 George E. Goodfellow (1855–1910) — recognized as first U.S. civilian trauma surgeon, expert in gunshot wound treatment
 Henry Gray (1827–1861) — English anatomist and surgeon, creator of Gray's Anatomy
 Ernst Haeckel (1834–1919) — physician and anatomist
 William Harvey (1578–1657) — English physician, described the circulatory system
 Henry Heimlich (1920–2016) — inventor of the Heimlich maneuver and the Vietnam War-era chest drain valve
 Orvan Hess (1906–2002) — fetal heart monitor and first successful use of penicillin
 Hippocrates (–370 BCE) — Greek father of medicine
 John Hunter (1728–1793) — father of modern surgery, famous for his study of anatomy
 Kurt Julius Isselbacher (1928–2019) — Former editor of Harrison's Principles of Internal Medicine, prominent Gastroenterologist, founder of the Massachusetts General Hospital Cancer Center, Association of American Physicians Kober Medal winner
 Edward Jenner (1749–1823) — English physician popularized vaccination
 Elliott P. Joslin (1869–1962) — pioneer in the treatment of diabetes
 Carl Jung (1875–1961) — Swiss psychiatrist
 Leo Kanner (1894–1981) — Austrian-American psychiatrist known for work on autism
 Seymour Kety (1915–2000) — American neuroscientist
 Robert Koch (1843–1910) — formulated Koch's postulates
 Theodor Kocher (1841–1917) — thyroid surgery; first surgeon to win the Nobel Prize
 Rene Theophile Hyacinthe Laennec (1781–1826) — inventor of the stethoscope
 Janet Lane-Claypon (1877–1967) — pioneer of epidemiology
 Thomas Linacre (1460–1524) — founder of Royal College of Physicians
 Joseph Lister (1827–1912) — pioneer of antiseptic surgery
 Richard Lower (1631–1691) — studied the lungs and heart, and performed the first blood transfusion
 Paul Loye (1861–1890) — studied the nervous system and decapitation
 Wilhelm Frederick von Ludwig (1790–1865) — German physician known for his 1836 publication on the condition now known as Ludwig's angina
 Amato Lusitano (1511–1568) — discovered venous valves, studied blood circulation
 Madhav (8th century A.D.) — medical text author and systematizer
 Maimonides (1135–1204)
 Marcello Malpighi (1628–1694) — Italian anatomist, pioneer in histology
 Barry Marshall (born 1951)
 Charles Horace Mayo (1865–1939) — co-founder, Mayo Clinic
 William James Mayo (1861–1939) — co-founder, Mayo Clinic
 William Worrall Mayo (1819–1911) — co-founder, Mayo Clinic
 Salvador Mazza (1886–1946) — Argentine epidemiologist who helped in controlling American trypanosomiasis
 William McBride (1927-2018) — discovered teratogenicity of thalidomide
 Otto Fritz Meyerhof (1884–1951) — studied muscle metabolism; Nobel prize
 George Richards Minot (1885–1950) — Nobel prize for his study of anemia
 B. K. Misra - first neurosurgeon in the world to perform image-guided surgery for aneurysms, first in South Asia to perform stereotactic radiosurgery, first in India to perform awake craniotomy and laparoscopic spine surgery.
 Frederic E. Mohs (1910–2002) — responsible for the method of surgery now called Mohs surgery
 Egas Moniz (1874–1955) — developed lobotomy and brain artery angiography
 Richard Morton (1637–1698) — identified tubercles in consumption (phthisis) of lungs; basis for modern name tuberculosis
 Herbert Needleman (1927–2017) — scientifically established link between lead poisoning and neurological damage; key figure in successful efforts to limit lead exposure
 Charles Jean Henri Nicolle (1866–1936) — microbiologist who won Nobel prize for work on typhus
 Ian Olver (born 1953)
 Gary Onik (born 1952) — inventor and pioneer of ultrasound guided cryosurgery for both the prostate and the liver
 William Osler (1849–1919) — "father of modern medicine"
 Ralph Paffenbarger (1922–2007) — conducted classic studies demonstrating conclusively that active people reduce their risk of heart disease and live longer
 George Papanicolaou (1883–1962) — Greek pioneer in cytopathology and early cancer detection; inventor of the Pap smear
 Paracelsus (1493–1541) — founder of toxicology
 Ambroise Paré (1510–1590) — advanced surgical wound treatment
 Wilder Penfield (1891–1976) — pioneer in neurology
 Marcus Raichle (born 1937) — father of functional neuroimaging
 Santiago Ramón y Cajal (1852–1934) — father of modern neuroscience for his development of the neuron theory
 Joseph Ransohoff (1915–2001) — neurosurgeon who invented the modern technique for removing brain tumors
 Sir William Refshauge (1913–2009) — Australian public health administrator
 Rhazes (–925) (Abu Bakr Mohammad Ibn Zakariya al-Razi)
 Juan Rosai (1940–2020) — advanced surgical pathology; discovered the desmoplastic small round cell tumor and Rosai–Dorfman disease
 Jonas Salk (1914–1995) — developed a vaccine for polio
 Lall Sawh (born 1951) — Trinidadian surgeon/urologist and pioneer of kidney transplantation in the Caribbean
 Martin Schurig (1656–1733) — first physician to occupy himself with the anatomy of the sexual organs.
 Ignaz Semmelweis (1818–1865) — a pioneer of avoiding cross-infection — introduced hand washing and instrument cleaning
 Victor Skumin (born 1948) — first to describe a previously unknown disease, now called Skumin syndrome (a disorder of the central nervous system of some patients after receiving a prosthetic heart valve)
 John Snow (1813–1858) — anaesthetist and pioneer epidemiologist who studied cholera
 Thomas Starzl (1926–2017) — performed the first liver transplant
 Andrew Taylor Still (1828–1917) — father of osteopathic medicine
 Susruta — Indian physician and pioneering surgeon
 Thomas Sydenham (1642–1689) — clinician
 James Mourilyan Tanner (1920–2010) — developed Tanner stages and advanced auxology
 Helen B. Taussig (1898–1986) — founded field of pediatric cardiology, worked to prevent thalidomide marketing in the US
 Carlo Urbani (1956–2003) — discovered and died from SARS
 Andreas Vesalius (1514–1564) — Belgian anatomist, often referred to as the founder of modern human anatomy
 Vidus Vidius (1508–1569) — first professor of medicine at the College Royal and author of medical texts
 Rudolf Virchow (1821–1902) — German pathologist, founder of fields of comparative pathology and cellular pathology
 Carl Warburg (1805–1892) — German/British physician and clinical pharmacologist, inventor of Warburg's Tincture, a famed antipyretic and antimalarial medicine of the Victorian era
 Otto Heinrich Warburg (1883–1970) — German physiologist, medical doctor; Nobel prize 1931
 Allen Oldfather Whipple (1881–1963) — devised the Whipple procedure in 1935 for treatment of pancreatic cancer
 Priscilla White (1900–1989) — developed classification of diabetes mellitus and pregnancy to assess and reduce the risk of miscarriage, birth defect, stillbirth, and maternal death
 Carl Wood (1929–2011) — developed and commercialized in-vitro fertilization
 Alfred Worcester (1855–1951) — pioneer in geriatrics, palliative care, appendectomy, cesarean section, student health, nursing education
 Ole Wormius (1588–1654) — pioneer in embryology
 Sir Magdi Yacoub (born 1935) — one of the leading developers of the techniques of heart and heart-lung transplantation
 Boris Yegorov (1937–1994) — first physician in space (1964)
 Zhang Xichun (1860–1933) — first physician to integrate Chinese and Western medicine

Physicians famous chiefly as eponyms 

Among the better known eponyms:
 Thomas Addison (1793–1860) – Addison's disease
 Alois Alzheimer (1864–1915) – Alzheimer's disease
 Hans Asperger (1906–1980) – Asperger syndrome
 John Brereton Barlow (1924–2008) – Barlow's syndrome
 Karl Adolph von Basedow – Basedow disease
 Hulusi Behçet – Behçet's disease
 Paul Broca – Broca's area
 David Bruce – Brucellosis
 Denis Parsons Burkitt – Burkitt lymphoma
 Albert Calmette (1863–1933) – Bacillus Calmette-Guérin (BCG), a vaccine for tuberculosis
 Carlos Chagas (1879–1934) – Chagas disease
 Jean-Martin Charcot (1825–1893) – Maladie de Charcot, Charcot joints, Charcot's triad, Charcot-Marie-Tooth disease
 Jerome W. Conn (1907–1981) – Conn's Syndrome (primary hyperaldosteronism)
 Burrill Bernard Crohn (1884–1983) – Crohn's disease
 Harvey Cushing – Cushing's disease
 John Langdon Down – Down syndrome
 Bartolomeo Eustachi – Eustachian tube
 Gabriele Falloppio – Fallopian tube
 Camillo Golgi (1843–1926) – Golgi apparatus
 Ernst Gräfenberg – Gräfenberg spot (G-spot)
 Joseph-Ignace Guillotin (1738–1814) – guillotine
 Gerhard Armauer Hansen – Hansen's disease
 Thomas Hodgkin – Hodgkin's disease
 George Huntington – Huntington's disease
 Moritz Kaposi – Kaposi's sarcoma
 Wilhelm Frederick von Ludwig (1790–1865) – Ludwig's angina
 Charles Mantoux (1877–1947) – Mantoux test for tuberculosis
 Antoine Marfan (1858–1942) – Marfan syndrome
 Silas Weir Mitchell (1829–1914) – Mitchell's disease
 James Paget (1814–1899) – Paget's disease
 James Parkinson (1755–1824) – Parkinson's syndrome
 Juan Rosai (1940–2020) – Rosai–Dorfman disease
 Daniel Elmer Salmon – Salmonella
 Gunnar B. Stickler – Stickler syndrome
 Georges Albert Édouard Brutus Gilles de la Tourette – Tourette syndrome
 Max Wilms (1867–1918) – Wilms' tumor
 Samuel Alexander Kinnier Wilson – Wilson's disease

Physicians famous as criminals 
 John Bodkin Adams – British general practitioner; suspected serial killer, thought to have killed over 160 patients; acquitted of one murder in 1957 but convicted of prescription fraud, not keeping a dangerous drug register, obstructing a police search and lying on cremation forms
 Karl Brandt (1904–1948) – Nazi human experimentation
 Edme Castaing – murderer
 George Chapman – Polish poisoner and Jack the Ripper suspect
 Robert George Clements – murderer
 Nigel Cox – only British doctor to be convicted of attempted euthanasia
 Thomas Neill Cream – murderer
 Hawley Harvey Crippen – executed for his wife's murder
 Baruch Goldstein (1956–1994) – assassin
 Linda Hazzard – convicted of murdering one patient but suspected of 12 in total
 H.H. Holmes – American serial killer
 Shirō Ishii – headed Japan's Unit 731 during World War II which conducted human experimentation for weapons and medical research
 Mario Jascalevich - killed 9 hospital patients using curare
 Radovan Karadžić (born 1945) – convicted of genocide, crimes against humanity, and war crimes in Yugoslavia
 Jack Kevorkian (1923–2011) – convicted of second-degree murder, Michigan, April 13, 1999
 Jeffrey R. MacDonald – murdered a pregnant wife and two daughters in 1979
 Josef Mengele (1911–1979) – known as the Angel of Death; Nazi human experimentation
 Samuel Mudd (1833–1883) – condemned to prison for setting the leg of Abraham Lincoln's assassin
 Herman Webster Mudgett (1860–1896) – American serial killer
 Conrad Murray – convicted of involuntary manslaughter in death of pop star Michael Jackson
 Arnfinn Nesset – Norwegian serial killer
 William Palmer – British poisoner
 Marcel Petiot – French serial killer
 Herta Oberheuser (1911–1978) – Nazi human experimentation
 Richard J. Schmidt – American physician who contaminated his girlfriend with AIDS-tainted blood
 Harold Shipman (1946–2004) – British serial killer
 Michael Swango (born 1953) – American serial killer
 An A-Z list of Wikipedia articles of Nazi doctors

Physicians famous as writers 

Among the better known writers:
 Mikhail Bulgakov (1891–1940) -  Russian novelist and playwright
 Louis-Ferdinand Celine (1894–1961) - French novelist, author of Journey to the End of the Night
 Graham Chapman (1941–1989) - writer and actor, founding member of Monty Python
 Anton Chekhov (1860–1904) - Russian playwright
 Robin Cook - American author of bestselling novels, wrote Coma
 Michael Crichton (1942–2008) - American author of Jurassic Park
 A. J. Cronin (1896–1981) - Scottish novelist and essayist, author of The Citadel
 Anthony Daniels (born 1949) - as 'Theodore Dalrymple' and under his own name, a British author, critic and social and cultural commentator
 Sir Arthur Conan Doyle (1859–1930) - British author of Sherlock Holmes fame
 Khaled Hosseini (born 1965) - American author, originally from Afghanistan, of bestselling novels The Kite Runner and A Thousand Splendid Suns
 John Keats (1795–1821) - English poet
 Morio Kita - Japanese novelist and essayist; son of Mokichi Saitō
 Jean Baptiste Lefebvre de Villebrune (1732–1809) - French physician who translated several works from Latin, English, Spanish, Italian, and German into French
 Luke the Evangelist - one of the four Gospel writers of the Bible
 John S. Marr - proposed natural explanations for the ten plagues of Egypt
 W. Somerset Maugham (1874–1965) - British novelist and short story writer, wrote Of Human Bondage
 Alfred de Musset (1810–1857) - French playwright, discovered sign of syphilitic aortitis
 Taslima Nasrin
 Mori Ōgai - Japanese novelist, poet, and literary critic
 Walker Percy (1916–1990) - American philosopher and writer
 François Rabelais (1483–1553) - French author of Gargantua and Pantagruel
 Mokichi Saitō - Japanese poet
 Friedrich von Schiller (1759–1805), German writer, poet, essayist and dramatist
 William Carlos Williams (1883–1963) - American poet and essayist

And others:
 Patrick Abercromby (1656–) - historian
 Chris Adrian
 Jacob Appel - short story writer
 John Arbuthnot
 Janet Asimov (1926-2019) (née Janet O. Jeppson) - American psychiatrist, wife of Isaac Asimov
 Arnie Baker - cycling coach
 Cora Belle Brewster (1859–?), writer, editor
 Sir Thomas Browne (1605–1682) - British writer
 Georg Büchner - German dramatist
 Ludwig Büchner - German philosopher
 Thomas Campion - poet, composer
 Ethan Canin - novelist, short story writer
 Deepak Chopra - Indian/American writer of self-help and health books
 Alex Comfort (1920–2000) - British writer and poet, author of The Joy of Sex
 Ctesias (5th century B.C.) - Greek historian
 Steven Clark Cunningham (born 1972), children's poem writer
 Erasmus Darwin (1731–1802) - British poet, grandfather of Charles Darwin
 Georges Duhamel (1884–1966) - French writer, dramatist, poet and humanist
 Havelock Ellis (1859–1940) - British writer and poet, author of The Psychology of Sex
 Viktor Frankl (1905–1997) - Austrian neurologist and psychiatrist, author of Man's Search for Meaning
 Samuel Garth (1661–1719) - British author and translator of classics
 Elmina M. Roys Gavitt (1828–1898) - American physician; medical journal founder, editor-in-chief
 Atul Gawande - surgeon and New Yorker medical writer
 William Gilbert - British author; father of W. S. Gilbert
 Oliver Goldsmith - British author
 Oliver Wendell Holmes, Sr. (1809–1894) - American essayist
 Richard Hooker - author of M*A*S*H
 Arthur Johnston (1587–1641) - poet
 Charles Krauthammer (1950–2018) - American psychiatrist, syndicated political columnist
 R. D. Laing - Scottish writer and poet, leader of the anti-psychiatry movement
 Stanisław Lem (1929–2006) - Polish author of science-fiction (Solaris)
 Carlo Levi (1902–1975) - Italian novelist and writer
 David Livingstone (1813–1873) - Scottish medical missionary, explorer of Africa, travel writer
 Adeline Yen Mah - Chinese-American author
 Paolo Mantegazza (1831–1910) - Italian writer, author of science fiction book L'Anno 3000
 Jean-Paul Marat (1743–1793) - French writer, a leader of French Revolution; assassinated in bathtub
 Silas Weir Mitchell (1829–1914) - American writer
 Mungo Park - Scottish physician and explorer
 Hakim Syed Zillur Rahman - Indian author and translator of classical manuscripts
 José Rizal (1861–1896) - Filipino novelist, scientist, linguist, and national hero
 João Guimarães Rosa - Brazilian writer
 Sir Ronald Ross (1857–1932) - British writer and poet, discovered the malarial parasite
 Theodore Isaac Rubin (1923–2019) - American author of David and Lisa
 Oliver Sacks (1933–2015) - British essayist (The Man Who Mistook his Wife for a Hat)
 Albert Schweitzer (1875–1965) - German charitative worker, Nobel Peace Prize laureate (1952), theologian, philosopher, organist, musicologist
 Frank Slaughter (1908–2001) - American bestseller author, wrote (Doctor's Wives)
 Tobias Smollett (1721–1771) - author
 Benjamin Spock (1903–1988) - American pediatrician, wrote Baby and Child Care
 Patrick Taylor - Canadian best-selling novelist
 Osamu Tezuka - Japanese cartoonist and animator;  the "father of anime"
 Lewis Thomas (1913–1993) - American essayist and poet
 Sir Henry Thompson — British surgeon and polymath
 Vladislav Vančura (1891–1942) - Czech writer, screenwriter and film director
 Francis Brett Young (1884–1954) - English novelist and poet

Physicians famous as politicians 
 Nazira Abdula, Mozambican Minister of Health
 Ayad Allawi - interim Prime Minister of Iraq
 Salvador Allende (1908–1973) - Chilean president
 Emilio Álvarez Montalván - Foreign Minister of Nicaragua
 Arnulfo Arias - Panamanian President
 Firdous Ashiq Awan - Pakistani politician
 Bashar Al-Assad - Syrian national leader
 Michelle Bachelet (born 1951) - Chilean president
 Hastings Kamuzu Banda (1898–1997) - Prime Minister, President and later dictator of Malawi
 Gro Harlem Brundtland (born 1939) - first Norwegian female prime minister; Director-General of the World Health Organization
 Margaret Chan - Director General of the WHO; former Director of Health of Hong Kong
 Chen Chi-mai - former mayor of Kaohsiung, Taiwan
 York Chow - Secretary for Health, Welfare and Food of Hong Kong
 Denzil Douglas - Prime Ministers of Saint Kitts and Nevis, 1995–2015
 François Duvalier (1907–1971) - also known as Papa Doc; President and later dictator of Haiti
 Antônio Palocci Filho - Brazilian politician, Finance Minister
 Christian Friedrich, Baron von Stockmar -  Anglo-Belgian statesman
 Che Guevara - Latin American revolutionary leader
 George Habash - founder of the Popular Front for the Liberation of Palestine
 Ibrahim al-Jaafari - Prime minister of Iraq
 Radovan Karadžić (born 1945) - first President of Republika Srpska, now facing charges for genocide and crimes against humanity
 Mohammad-Reza Khatami - Iranian politician
 Ewa Kopacz - Polish Prime Minister who succeeded Donald Tusk, 2014–2015
 Juscelino Kubitscheck - Brazilian president
 Mahathir bin Mohamad - Malaysian prime minister
 Agostinho Neto (1922–1979) - MPLA leader and president of Angola
 Navin Ramgoolam - Prime minister of Mauritius
 Lloyd Richardson - President of the Parliament of Sint Maarten, 2014–2015
 José Rizal (1861–1896) - Filipino revolutionary and national hero
 Bidhan Chandra Roy - Indian politician
 Hélio de Oliveira Santos - Brazilian politician, mayor of Campinas
 Sun Yat-sen (1866–1925) - founder of the Republic of China
 Tabaré Vázquez - former Uruguayan President
 Ali Akbar Velayati (born 1945) - Iranian Foreign Minister, 1981–1997
 Ursula von der Leyen (born 1958) - German Federal Minister of Defence
 William Walker (1824–1860) - ruler of Nicaragua
 Ram Baran Yadav (born 1948) - first elected president of the republic of Nepal
 Yeoh Eng-kiong - former Secretary for Health and Welfare of Hong Kong

Argentina 
 Luis Agote (1868–1954)
 Nicolas Bazan (born 1942)
 Hermes Binner
 Eduardo Braun-Menéndez (1903–1959)
 Ramón Carrillo (1906–1956)
 Bernardo Houssay (1887–1971)
 René Favaloro (1923–2000)
 Arturo Umberto Illia - 35th President of Argentina (1963–1966)
 Luis Federico Leloir (1906–1987)
 Julia Polak (1939–2014)
 Alberto Carlos Taquini (1905–1998)

Azerbaijan 
 Karim bey Mehmandarov

Australia 
 Bob Brown - parliamentary leader of the Australian Greens
 Andrew Laming - Australian politician
 Peter Macdonald
 Brendan Nelson - Australian politician
 Sir Earle Page - Prime Minister of Australia
 Dinesh Palipana - first quadriplegic medical graduate in Queensland, disability advocate
 Andrew Refshauge - Australian politician
 Mal Washer
 Michael Wooldridge

Canada 
 Philippe Couillard- former Prime Minister of Quebec
 Thomas "Tommy" Douglas
 Carolyn Bennett
 Stanley K. Bernstein
 Frederick William Borden - Canadian MP and minister of the Militia
 Bernard-Augustin Conroy
 John Waterhouse Daniel
 Hedy Fry (born 1941) - Canadian politician, member of parliament
 Dennis Furlong
 Charles Godfrey
 Grant Hill - former Canadian MP
 Wilbert Keon - Canadian senator
 Keith Martin - Portuguese Canadian MP
 William McGuigan - mayor of Vancouver, British Columbia
 Théodore Robitaille - Lieutenant Governor of Quebec, Quebec MNA and Senator
 Bette Stephenson - Ontario MPP and former Minister of Labour, Minister of Education and Minister of Colleges and Universities
 Donald Matheson Sutherland - MP and former minister of National Defence
 David Swann
 Sir Charles Tupper (1821–1915) - Prime Minister of Canada (1896) and Premier of Nova Scotia (1864–1867); High Commissioner in Great Britain (1884–1887)

France 
 Louis Auguste Blanqui - French revolutionary socialist
 Georges Clemenceau (1841–1929) - French statesman
 Jean-Paul Marat - French revolution leader

Italy 
 Guido Baccelli (1830–1916) - seven times Minister of education

Japan 
 Tomoko Abe - Representative of Japan
 Ichirō Kamoshita - Representative of Japan, former Environment Minister
 Taro Nakayama - former Representative of Japan, former Foreign Minister
 Chikara Sakaguchi - Representative of Japan, former Minister of Health, Labour and Welfare
 Koichiro Shimizu - former Representative of Japan, one of Koizumi Children
 Tsutomu Tomioka - former Representative of Japan, one of Koizumi Children

Pakistan 
 Firdous Ashiq Awan
 Asim Hussain
 Ghulam Hussain

The Netherlands 
 Frederik van Eeden
 J. Slauerhoff
 Simon Vestdijk
 Leo Vroman

United Kingdom 
 Liam Fox - British Secretary of State for Defence
 John Pope Hennessy - former Governor of Hong Kong
 David Owen - British politician

United States 
 Stewart Barlow - member of the Utah House of Representatives
 Larry Bucshon (born 1962) - U.S. Congressman from Indiana
 Michael C. Burgess (born 1950) - U.S. Congressman from Texas
 Ben Carson (born September 18, 1951) - United States Secretary of Housing and Urban Development
 Tom Coburn (1948-2020) - U.S. Senator
 Howard Dean (born 1948) - former Governor of Vermont
 Scott Ecklund - member of the South Dakota House of Representatives
 Joe Ellington (born 1959) - member of the West Virginia House of Delegates
 Bill Frist (born 1952) - United States Senate Majority Leader
 Joe Heck (born 1961) - U.S. Congressman
 Steve Henry (born 1953) - Lieutenant Governor of Kentucky
 Jim McDermott - U.S. Congressman
 Larry McDonald - U.S. Congressman
 Ralph Northam (born 1959) - Governor of Virginia
 Christopher Ottiano (born 1969) - member of the Rhode Island Senate
 Rand Paul (born 1963) - U.S. Senator
 Ron Paul (born 1935) - U.S. Congressman
 Tom Price (American politician) (born October 8, 1954) - U.S. Congressman from Georgia and former Secretary of Health and Human Services
 David Watkins - member of the Kentucky House of Representatives
 Dave Weldon - U.S. Congressman and autism activist
 Ray Lyman Wilbur (1875–1949) - United States Secretary of the Interior, president of Stanford University
 Milton R. Wolf
 Thomas Wynne (1627–1691) - physician to William Penn, speaker of the first two Provincial Assemblies in Philadelphia (1687 & 1688)

Physicians famous as sportspeople 
 Tenley Albright — Olympic figure skating champion
 Lisa Aukland — American professional bodybuilder and powerlifter
 Sir Roger Bannister (1929–2018) — first man to break the four-minute mile; English neurologist
 Tim Brabants — sprint kayaker, Olympic gold medalist
 Felipe Contepomi — Argentine rugby union footballer
 Ted Eisenberg — American 2018 world champion in long distance tomahawk throwing
 Gail Hopkins — American professional baseball player
 David Gerrard — New Zealand swimmer
 Randy Gregg — ice hockey player
 Jack Lovelock (1910–1949) — Olympic athlete
 Richard Mamiya (1925–2019) — football player
 Doc Medich, American baseball player
 Stephen Rerych — American swimmer, Olympic champion, and former world record-holder
 Dot Richardson — American softball player, Olympics; orthopedic physician
 Sócrates (Sócrates Brasileiro Sampaio de Souza Vieira de Oliveira) — Brazilian soccer player, played for the national team 1979–1986

Physicians famous for their role in television and the media

Australia 
 Jeremy Cumpston
 Jonathan LaPaglia
 Peter Larkins
 Renee Lim
 Andrew Rochford
 Rob Sitch

Brazil 
 Lúcia Petterle

Finland 
 Emilia Vuorisalmi

Germany 
 Marianne Koch
 Gunther Philipp

Ireland 
 Ronan Tynan

Malta 
 Gianluca Bezzina

Norway 
 Anders Danielsen Lie
 Gro Harlem Brundtland (born 1939) - first Norwegian female prime minister; Director-General of the World Health Organization

Pakistan 
 Shaista Lodhi
 Ayesha Gul
 Fahad Mirza

South Africa 
 Phil du Plessis

Spain 
 El Gran Wyoming

Sweden 
 Staffan Hallerstam
 Jesper Salén
 Rebecka Liljeberg

United Kingdom 
 Carina Tyrrell
 Tony Gardner
 Harry Hill
 Christian Jessen
 Sunshine Martyn
 Pixie McKenna
 Sir Jonathan Wolfe Miller
 Darwin Shaw
 Hank Wangford

United States 
 Jennifer Ashton
 Andrew Baldwin
 Jennifer Berman
 Deepak Chopra
 Lyn Christie
 Terry Dubrow
 Garth Fisher
 Leo Galland
 Anthony C. Griffin
 Sanjay Gupta
 Randal Haworth
 Jason Todd Ipson
 Matt Iseman
 Ken Jeong
 Sean Kenniff
 Will Kirby
 C. Everett Koop
 John S. Marr
 Lucky Meisenheimer
 Paul Nassif
 Andrew P. Ordon
 Mehmet Oz
 Nicholas Perricone
 Drew Pinsky
 Bernard Punsly
 Brent Ridge
 Nancy Snyderman
 Benjamin Spock
 Travis Stork

Physicians famous as beauty queens 
 Mahmure Birsen Sakaoğlu, Miss Turkey 1936
 Eva Andersson-Dubin, Miss Sweden 1980
 Deidre Downs, Miss America 2005
 Anna Malova,  Miss Russia 1998
 Lúcia Petterle, Miss World 1971
 Limor Schreibman-Sharir, Miss Israel 1973

Physicians famous as first ladies
 Susan Lynch (pediatrician),  First Lady of New Hampshire
 Mildred Scheel, wife of Walter Scheel

Physicians famous for other activities

 Anderson Ruffin Abbott
 Jane Addams — social activist
 Dav and ultrasound technologies to Saint Vincent and the Grenadines
 Oswald Avery (1877–1955) — molecular biologist who discovered DNA carried genetic information
 Ali Bacher — cricketer
 Abd al-Latif al-Baghdadi — traveller
 Roger Bannister — runner, first sub-four-minute miler
 Josiah Bartlett — American statesman and chief justice of New Hampshire
 T. Romeyn Beck (1791–1855) — American forensic medicine pioneer
 Ramon Betances — surgeon, PR nationalist
 Maximilian Bircher-Benner (1867–1939) — nutritionist
 Oscar Biscet — human rights advocate
 Herman Boerhaave — humanist
 Alexander Borodin — composer, chemist
 Thomas Bowdler — censor
 Lafayette Bunnell — explorer of Yosemite Valley
 John Caius (1510–1573) — physician and educator
 Roberto Canessa — survivor of Uruguayan Air Force Flight 571, which crashed in the Andes Mountains in 1972
 Gerolamo Cardano — mathematician
 Alexis Carrell — transplant surgeon, eugenicist, Vichy sympathizer
 Ben Carson — African-American neurosurgeon
 Anton Chekhov — Writer
 Laurel B. Clark (1961–2003) — American astronaut, killed in the Space Shuttle Columbia disaster
 Nicolaus Copernicus (1473–1543) — mathematician and astronomer
 Merv Cross
 Ted Eisenberg — Guinness World Record holder for most breast augmentation surgeries performed.
 Steven Eisenberg — known as "The Singing Cancer Doctor."
 Sextus Empiricus (2nd–3rd century C.E.) — philosopher
 Ken Evoy
 Giovanni Fontana — Venetian physician, engineer, and encyclopedist
 Luigi Galvani — physicist
 Pierre Gassendi (1592–1655) — philosopher
 William Gilbert (1544–1603) — physicist
 Carl Goresky — physician and scientist
 W. G. Grace — cricketer
 John Franklin Gray (1804–1881) — American educator, first practitioner of homeopathy in the US
 Nehemiah Grew — botanist
 Samuel Hahnemann — founder of homeopathy
 Armand Hammer — entrepreneur
 Daniel Harris
 Karin M. Hehenberger — diabetes expert
 Hermann von Helmholtz — physicist
 Jan Baptist van Helmont (1577–1655) — physiologist
 Harry Hill  — British comedian
 Courtney Howard, Yellowknife-based ER physician and one-time leadership candidate, Green Party of Canada
 Samuel Gridley Howe — abolitionist
 Ebenezer Kingsbury Hunt (1810–1889) — President of the Connecticut State Medical Society; director of the Retreat for the Insane
 Varsha Jain - UK Space doctor/researcher for women's health
 Mae Jemison (born 1956) — astronaut
 David Johnson — American swimmer
 Stuart Kauffman (born 1939) — biologist
 John Keats — poet and author
 John Harvey Kellogg — cereal manufacturer
 Charles Krauthammer (1950–2018) — columnist and political commentator
 Cesare Lombroso (1835–1909) — based his system of criminology on physiognomy
 John McAndrew (1927–2013) — All-Ireland Gaelic Footballer
 June McCarroll — inventor of lane markings
 Pat McGeer — Canadian basketball player
 James McHenry (1753–1816) — signer of the United States Constitution
 Archibald Menzies — naturalist
 Franz Mesmer (1734–1815) — proponent of mesmerism and the idea of animal magnetism
 Jonathan Miller (1934–2019) — television presenter and stage director
 Paul Möhring (1710–1792) — zoologist, botanist
 Maria Montessori — educator
 Boris V. Morukov — cosmonaut
 Lee "Final Table" Nelson — professional poker player
 Haing S. Ngor — Oscar-winning film actor
 Heinrich Wilhelm Matthäus Olbers (1758–1840) — astronomer
 Dinesh Palipana  — physician with disability and advocate
 Roza Papo — army general
 James Parkinson — physician, geologist, political activist
 Claude Perrault — architect
 Christian Hendrik Persoon — South African botanist
 Pope John XXI  — pope
 Scott Powell — co-founder of the nostalgia group Sha Na Na
 Weston A. Price — traveler, educator
 Syed Ziaur Rahman — physician and medical scientist
 John Ray — plant taxonomer
 Prathap C. Reddy
 Bradbury Robinson — threw the first legal forward pass in American football history while a medical student at St. Louis University
 Peter Mark Roget — English lexicographer
 Jacques Rogge — sports official
 Mowaffak al-Rubaie — human rights advocate, member of the Interim Iraqi Governing Council
 Benjamin Rush — signer of the United States Constitution
 Daniel Rutherford (1749–1819) — chemist
 Bendapudi Venkata Satyanarayana
 Félix Savart — physicist
 Albert Schweitzer — humanist
 Michael Servetus (1511–1553) — burnt at the stake by Calvinists for heresy
 Paul Sinha — British comedian
 Rob Sitch — Australian comedian
 Sócrates (1954–2011, Sócrates Brasileiro Sampaio de Souza Vieira de Oliveira) — Brazilian football (soccer) player
 James Hudson Taylor (1832–1905) — British missionary to China and founder of the China Inland Mission
 Norman Earl Thagard — astronaut
 Debi Thomas (born 1967) — Olympic figure skater
 William E. Thornton — astronaut
 John Tidwell — American basketball player
 Nasiruddin al-Tusi — astronomer
 Andrew Wakefield — conducted studies on disputed link between vaccines and neurodevelopmental disorders, which had many serious consequences
 William Walker — Latin American adventurer
 Moshe Wallach (1866–1957) — founder and director of Shaare Zedek Hospital, Jerusalem, for 45 years
 John Clarence Webster — Canadian historian
 Wilhelm Weinberg — with G. H. Hardy, developed the Hardy–Weinberg equilibrium model of population genetics
 JPR Williams — rugby union player
 Hugh Williamson — American patriot, statesman, Surgeon General of SC
 Thomas Young — scientist

See also 
 List of fictional physicians
 List of psychiatrists
 List of neurologists and neurosurgeons
 List of people in healthcare
 List of presidents of the Royal College of Physicians
 List of Iraqi physicians
 List of Russian physicians and psychologists
 List of Slovenian physicians
 List of Turkish physicians

References